Secundilactobacillus is a genus of lactic acid bacteria containing secondary fermenters separated from the primary fermenters of Lactobacillus after the latter group depletes hexoses and disaccharides. These Gram-positive, rod-shaped heterofermenters have been isolated from beer and apple cider, and they are generally incapable of reducing fructose to mannitol.

Species

Using whole-genome sequencing, Zheng et al. 2020 reclassified twelve Lactobacillus species into the novel genera Secundilactobacillus. The List of Prokaryotic names with Standing in Nomenclature (LPSN) currently recognizes fifteen member species:
 Secundilactobacillus angelensis Zhang et al. 2022
 Secundilactobacillus collinoides (Carr and Davies 1972) Zheng et al. 2020
 Secundilactobacillus folii Phuengjayaem et al. 2021
 Secundilactobacillus hailunensis Liu et al. 2021
 Secundilactobacillus kimchicus (Liang et al. 2011) Zheng et al. 2020
 Secundilactobacillus malefermentans (Farrow et al. 1989) Zheng et al. 2020
 Secundilactobacillus mixtipabuli (Tohno et al. 2015) Zheng et al. 2020
 Secundilactobacillus odoratitofui (Chao et al. 2010) Zheng et al. 2020
 Secundilactobacillus oryzae (Tohno et al. 2013) Zheng et al. 2020
 Secundilactobacillus paracollinoides (Suzuki et al. 2004) Zheng et al. 2020
 Secundilactobacillus pentosiphilus (Tohno et al. 2017) Zheng et al. 2020
 Secundilactobacillus silagei (Tohno et al. 2013) Zheng et al. 2020
 Secundilactobacillus silagincola (Tohno et al. 2017) Zheng et al. 2020
 Secundilactobacillus similis (Kitahara et al. 2010) Zheng et al. 2020
 Secundilactobacillus yichangensis Liu et al. 2021

These species have genomes sizes ranging from 1.85 Mbp for S. oryzae to 3.62 Mbp for S. collinoides, and their GC-content ranges from 41.03-47%.

References

Lactobacillaceae
Bacteria genera